Robert Terence Traynor (born 1 November 1983) is an English retired semi-professional footballer who made over 210 appearances in the Isthmian League for Kingstonian as a forward. He began his career in the Football League with Brentford, before dropping into non-League football upon his release in 2004.

Career

Brentford 
A right midfielder, Traynor began his career in the youth system at Second Division club Brentford and signed his first professional contract in 2002. He made three senior appearances during the 2002–03 season and was an unused substitute on two occasions early in the 2003–04 season, but was released by incoming manager Martin Allen in April 2004.

Non-League football 
While still a Brentford player, Traynor was loaned to Southern League Premier Division clubs Chelmsford City and Crawley Town during the 2003–04 season and joined Crawley on a permanent basis in April 2004. Moves to Farnborough Town, Maidenhead United and Walton & Hersham followed in 2005, before he joined former Walton & Hersham manager Alan Dowson at Isthmian League First Division club Kingstonian in January 2007. Traynor had six successful seasons with the Kingstonian, scoring 146 goals, making 250 appearances, winning three Isthmian League divisional golden boots and helping the club to promotion to the Premier Division during the 2008–09 season. He departed at the end of the 2011–12 season and took a year out of the game, before he finished his career with a short spell at Walton Casuals early in the 2013–14 season.

Personal life 
Traynor is married and works for an IT assurance company.

Career statistics

Honours
Crawley Town
Southern League Premier Division (1): 2003–04
Kingstonian
Isthmian League First Division South (1): 2008–09

Individual

FA Cup Player of the Round (1): first qualifying round, 2009–10
Isthmian League Premier Division Golden Boot (2): 2009–10, 2010–11
Isthmian League First Division Golden Boot (1): 2008–09
Isthmian League Monthly Golden Boot (1): February 2007

References

External links

1983 births
Living people
People from Burnham, Buckinghamshire
English footballers
English Football League players
National League (English football) players
Isthmian League players
Brentford F.C. players
Chelmsford City F.C. players
Crawley Town F.C. players
Farnborough F.C. players
Maidenhead United F.C. players
Walton & Hersham F.C. players
Kingstonian F.C. players
Walton Casuals F.C. players
Southern Football League players
Association football forwards